Scackleton is a village and civil parish in the Ryedale district of North Yorkshire, England.

History
The village is mentioned three times in the Domesday Book as Scacheldene or Scachelsey in the Bulford hundred.  At the time of the Norman invasion, the lands around the village were owned by Orm, son of Gamal, Earl Waltheof and Gamal, son of Kalri. Afterwards the lands were granted to Hugh, son of Baldric, Count Robert of Mortain and King William I.

A school was built in the village in 1866, but is no longer in use. A Primitive Methodist church was also erected in 1888, which is also no longer in use.

Governance
The village lies within the Thirsk and Malton UK Parliament constituency. It also lies within the Hovingham & Sheriff Hutton electoral division of North Yorkshire County Council and the Ampleforth ward of Ryedale District Council.

The 1881 UK Census recorded the population as 165. The 2001 UK Census recorded the population as 109, of which 76 were over the age of sixteen and 52 of those were in employment. There were 48 dwellings of which 24 were detached. The 2011 Census showed the population as less than 100. Details are now included within Coulton.

Geography
The nearest settlements are Coulton  to the north; Wiganthorpe  to the south-east and Hovingham  to the north-east.

Religion
 
There is a church built in the early 20th century dedicated to St George, the Martyr.

References

External links

Villages in North Yorkshire
Civil parishes in North Yorkshire